Márton Fucsovics was the defending champion but was no longer eligible to compete as a Junior.

Luke Saville defeated Liam Broady in the final, 2–6, 6–4, 6–2 to win the boys' singles tennis title at the 2011 Wimbledon Championships.

Seeds

  Jiří Veselý (third round)
  Thiago Moura Monteiro (third round)
  Hugo Dellien (first round)
  Oliver Golding (second round)
  Filip Horanský (third round)
  Roberto Carballés Baena (second round)
  Dominic Thiem (third round)
  Mate Pavić (quarterfinals)
  Andrew Whittington (second round)
  George Morgan (second round)
  João Pedro Sorgi (first round)
  Patrick Ofner (first round)
  Jeson Patrombon (second round)
  Andrés Artuñedo (first round)
  Liam Broady (final)
  Luke Saville (champion)

Draw

Finals

Top half

Section 1

Section 2

Bottom half

Section 3

Section 4

References

External links

Boys' Singles
Wimbledon Championship by year – Boys' singles